The steam locomotives of Class 23 were German passenger train locomotives developed in the 1950s for the Deutsche Bundesbahn. They had a 2-6-2 wheel arrangement and were equipped with Class 2'2' T 31 tenders. They were designed to replace the once ubiquitous Prussian P 8 engines that had been built between 1908 and 1924 and, in their day, were the most numerous post-war replacement class.

Manufacture and Design

From 1950, 105 examples of this newly designed class were manufactured for medium passenger train and light express train services. They had welded locomotive frames, boilers and tenders together with all the latest refinements of German practice. These included a superheated multiple-valve regulator and central lubrication of the least accessible parts of the running gear. Engines up to operating number 023 had Knorr surface preheaters and journal bearings. Locomotives with serial numbers 024 and 025, as well as those from 053 onwards were equipped with roller bearings for the axles and drive as well as mixer-preheaters. A small number of vehicles were given Heinl preheaters and several were equipped for push-pull train operations.

Last new steam locomotive in West Germany

Locomotive number 23 105, built by Arnold Jung Lokomotivfabrik and taken into service by the DB in December 1959, was the last steam engine to enter service in the Federal Republic of Germany. After its retirement it was stabled at the Nuremberg Transport Museum where it was severely damaged by the great fire in the locomotive shed on 17 October 2005.

Reclassification and retirement

On the introduction of the new DB numbering scheme on 1 January 1968 the class was redesignated as Class 023. The last few locomotives were retired in 1976 at Crailsheim locomotive depot (Bahnbetriebswerk or Bw).

Preserved locomotives

The following engines had been preserved as at September 2006:

 23 019 in the German Steam Locomotive Museum (Deutsche Dampflokomotiv-Museum) at Neuenmarkt-Wirsberg in Upper Franconia, Bavaria, Germany.
 23 023 at the Stoom Stichting Nederland in Rotterdam, Netherlands  (operational since March 2019).
 23 029 as a monument in front of the technical school in Aalen, Germany.
 23 042 at the Darmstadt-Kranichstein Railway Museum in Hesse, Germany (operational).
 23 058 with EUROVAPOR in Basel-Haltingen, Switzerland, is looked after by Club 41 073 e. V. (operational). Rented to the Friese Stoomtrein Maatschappij (FStM) in the Netherlands.
 23 071 with the Veluwsche Stoomtrein Maatschappij in Apeldoorn, Netherlands (operational).
 23 076 also with the Veluwsche Stoomtrein Maatschappij in Apeldoorn (operational since June 2007).
 23 105 in the South German Railway Museum at Heilbronn (Süddeutsches Eisenbahnmuseum Heilbronn) in Baden-Württemberg, Germany (on loan from the DB until 2016).

See also
 Deutsche Bundesbahn
 List of DB locomotives and railbuses

References

 

23
2-6-2 locomotives
023
Henschel locomotives
Krupp locomotives
Arnold Jung locomotives
Esslingen locomotives
Railway locomotives introduced in 1950
Passenger locomotives
Standard gauge locomotives of Germany
1′C1′ h2 locomotives